Phacochoerini is a tribe of even-toed ungulates which encompasses the warthogs.

References

Suinae
 
Mammal tribes